Alva O. Duer (November 18, 1904 – November 18, 1987) was a college basketball coach and National Association of Intercollegiate Athletics (NAIA) and United States Olympic Committee administrator and is a member of the NAIA and Basketball Halls of Fame. He went to Stafford High School in Stafford, Kansas and was captain of the basketball team all four years he attended. He graduated from high school in 1923.

He coached college basketball at Pepperdine College in Los Angeles, California from 1939 to 1948. During that time, he had a record of 176–102 (.633). He led Pepperdine to five postseason appearances (4 NAIB and 1 NCAA), he also led Pepperdine to the 1945 NAIB final. He died on his 83rd birthday in 1987.

Head coaching record

References

External links
 

1904 births
1987 deaths
American men's basketball coaches
Basketball coaches from Kansas
Columbia University alumni
Naismith Memorial Basketball Hall of Fame inductees
National Collegiate Basketball Hall of Fame inductees
People from Reno County, Kansas
People from Stafford, Kansas
Pepperdine Waves athletic directors
Pepperdine Waves men's basketball coaches